Events from the year 1707 in the Kingdom of Scotland, then Scotland.

Incumbents 
 Monarch – Anne (until 1 May; Scotland and England unite)
 Secretary of State: Hugh Campbell, 3rd Earl of Loudoun, jointly with The Earl of Mar (post abolished at Act of Union)
 Secretary of State for Scotland, from 1 May, when the post was created: The Earl of Mar

Law officers 
 Lord Advocate – Sir James Stewart
 Solicitor General for Scotland – William Carmichael

Judiciary 
 Lord President of the Court of Session – Lord North Berwick
 Lord Justice General – Lord Tarbat
 Lord Justice Clerk – Lord Ormiston

Events 
 16 January – Parliament of Scotland passes the Union with England Act.
 19 March – official copy of the Act of Union signed by the Scottish Chancellor and the Act is ratified by the Parliament of England.
 25 March–28 April – last sitting of Parliament of Scotland in Edinburgh until it is revived in 1999 as the Scottish Parliament.
 25 April – a large school of whales appears in the Firth of Forth; 35 strand on the sands of Kirkcaldy.
 1 May – the new sovereign state of Great Britain comes into being as a result of the Acts of Union which combine the Kingdoms of England and Scotland into a single united Kingdom of Great Britain and merge the Parliaments of England and Scotland to form the Parliament of Great Britain. The Equivalent, a sum of £398,000, is paid to Scotland by the English government. The Honours of Scotland are locked away in Edinburgh Castle.
 Ormacleit Castle on South Uist is first occupied by Allan Macdonald, chief of Clanranald, and his family.

Births 
 10 April – John Pringle, physician (died 1782 in London)
 20 April – Robert Foulis, printer and publisher (died 1776)
 22 June (bapt.) – Elizabeth Blackwell, botanic writer and illustrator (died 1758 in London)
 5 September – John Forbes, British Army general (died 1759 in Philadelphia)
Date unknown
 Archibald Cameron of Lochiel, physician and last Jacobite to be executed for high treason (hanged 1753 in London)

Deaths 
 8 January – John Dalrymple, 1st Earl of Stair, politician (born 1648)
 10 March – James Carnegie, Member of the Parliament of Scotland
 17 March – William Hay, bishop (born 1647)
 2 June – Mary Erskine, businesswoman and philanthropist

See also 
 Timeline of Scottish history

References 

 
Years of the 18th century in Scotland
1700s in Scotland